Katra or Katara is the name given to caravanserai inns in Bengal.
The Bara Katra ("greater katra") and Chhota Katra ("lesser katra") refers to two magnificent Mughal katras in Dhaka, Bangladesh.

See also
 Mughal architecture

References

External links
 
 Bara Katra architecture

Old Dhaka
Buildings and structures in Dhaka
Caravanserais